Aundrey "Rozay" Walker (born January 15, 1993) is a former American football Offensive guard for the Miami Dolphins. He played college football at Southern California.

References

American football offensive guards
USC Trojans football players
Miami Dolphins players
1993 births
Living people